Elle Graham, also known as Woodes, is an Australian musician, singer-songwriter and producer from Melbourne, Australia. Her debut album “Crystal Ball” was released in 2020. Woodes has supported Client Liaison on their 2019 "The Real Thing" tour. Elle received full rotation on radio for singles including: "Run For It", "The Thaw", "Origami", Set Mo's "I Belong Here", and "Change My Mind". "I Belong here" went Platinum in Australia. Woodes covered a Vance Joy song for her triple j Like a Version. In 2021, she launched Tornado Club, a collaborative duo with The Kite String Tangle.

Touring 
In 2018 Woodes supported Sylvan Esso on their "What Now" tour. She also supported Børns on their Australian tours.

Discography

Albums
 Crystal Ball (2020)

EPs
Woodes x Elkkle (2015)
Woodes (2016)
Golden Hour (2018)

Singles
"Muddy" (2015)
"Coccon" (2015)
"Daggers & Knives" (2016)
"The Thaw" (2016)
"Rise" (2016)
"Bonfire" (2017)
"Run For It" (2017)
"Dots" (2017)
"Origami" (2018)
"Change My Mind" (2018)
"How Long I'd Wait" (2019)
"Silent Disco" (2019)
"Crystal Ball" (2020)

Features
Ford Miskin - "The Pier" (2016)
Golden Vessel - "Vines" (2016)
Kilter - "Waste time" (2017)
Set Mo - "I Belong Here" (2017)
Litche - "Voyage" (2018)
Katz - "Spinning Out" (2018)
Cosmo's Midnight - "Confidence" (2018)
Feki - "Thoughts Of You" (2018)
Golden Vessel - "Portrait" (2019)
Set Mo - "Counter Human Emotion" (2019)

References

Australian musicians
Living people
Australian women pop singers
21st-century Australian singers
21st-century Australian women singers
1993 births